Carville is originally a Normandy place name, which is a toponymic compound of Old French -ville "farm" (see villain, villein) and the Old Norse and Old Danish personal name Kári. Notable people with the name include:

Surname
 Allan Carville, New Zealand footballer
 Audrey Carville, Irish journalist
 Daragh Carville (born 1969), Irish playwright and screenwriter
 Edward P. Carville (1945–1947), American politician
 James Carville (born 1944), American political consultant
 Rory Carville, Irish chef
 Triona Carville, full name of Triona (singer) (born 1995), Irish singer-songwriter

Given name
 A. Carville Foster Jr. (born 1932), American politician
 Carville Benson (1872–1929), American politician

References